Overflow Glacier is a steep tributary glacier spilling into Ferrar Glacier from the south, just east of Briggs Hill, in Victoria Land. Given this descriptive name by the Western Journey Party, led by Taylor, of the British Antarctic Expedition, 1910–13.

Glaciers of Victoria Land
Scott Coast